The following is a list of notable alumni and faculty from the University of the Philippines Diliman.

Notable students and alumni

Arts and humanities

Business, economics and finance

Engineering, sciences and medicine

Politics, law and governance
 Benigno Aquino Jr. – Senator (1967–1972), Marcos opposition leader, Governor of Tarlac; member, Upsilon Sigma Phi
Arturo Tolentino – Philippine Vice President, 12th Senate President, Secretary of Foreign Affairs, and Metro Manila Representative; member, Upsilon Sigma Phi
Salvador Laurel – Philippine Vice President, Prime Minister, Senator, and Secretary of Foreign Affairs; member, Upsilon Sigma Phi
 Richard Gordon – Senator (2004–2010; 2016–Present) and Tourism Secretary (2001-2004); member, Upsilon Sigma Phi
 Francis Pangilinan – Senator (2001–2007; 2016–Present), Senate Majority Floor Leader (2004-2008); member, Upsilon Sigma Phi
Gil Puyat – 13th Senate President (1967-1972), Senator (1951–1972); member, Upsilon Sigma Phi
 Sotero Laurel – President Pro Tempore (1991-1992), Senator (1987–1992); member, Upsilon Sigma Phi
 Domocao Alonto – Senator (1956–1961), Islamic leader; member, Upsilon Sigma Phi
 Juan Liwag – Senator (1963–1969) and Justice Secretary; member, Upsilon Sigma Phi
 Gerry Roxas – Senator (1963–1972), Senate Minority Floor Leader, Capiz Representative; member, Upsilon Sigma Phi
 Mamintal A.J. Tamano – Senator (1969–1972, 1987–1992), Lanao del Sur Vice Governor; member, Upsilon Sigma Phi
 Joker Arroyo – Senator (2001–2013), Executive Secretary, and Makati Representative; member, Upsilon Sigma Phi
 Martin Romualdez – Leyte Representative (2007–2016; 2019–Present); member, Upsilon Sigma Phi
Jesus Crispin Remulla – Cavite Representative (2004–2013; 2019–Present); member, Upsilon Sigma Phi
Roman Romulo – Pasig Representative (2007–2016; 2019–Present); member, Upsilon Sigma Phi
Arnulf Bryan Fuentebella – Camarines Sur Representative (2019–Present); member, Upsilon Sigma Phi
Isagani Amatong - Zamboanga del Norte Representative (2019–Present); member, Upsilon Sigma Phi
Victor Yap - Tarlac Representative (2019–Present); member, Upsilon Sigma Phi
Rimpy Bondoc - Pampanga Representative (2019–Present); member, Upsilon Sigma Phi
José Laurel Jr. – 9th Speaker of the House of Representatives; Batangas Representative (1941-1957; 1961–1972; 1984–1986); member, Upsilon Sigma Phi
 Nicanor Yñiguez – 15th Speaker of the House of Representatives; Southern Leyte Representative (1957–1972; 1984–1986); member, Upsilon Sigma Phi
 Wenceslao Vinzons – Camarines Norte Representative (1941–1942); member, Upsilon Sigma Phi
 Gerardo Roxas Jr. – Capiz Representative (1987–1993); member, Upsilon Sigma Phi
 Gilbert Remulla – Cavite Representative (2001–2004); member, Upsilon Sigma Phi
 Roque Ablan, Jr. – Ilocos Norte Representative (1967–1973; 1987–1998; 2001–2010); member, Upsilon Sigma Phi
 Felix William Fuentebella – Camarines Sur Representative (2001–2004; 2013–2016) ; member, Upsilon Sigma Phi
 Roberto S. Benedicto - Ambassador to Japan (1972-1978); First Class, Order of the Rising Sun (1977); member, Upsilon Sigma Phi
 Querube Makalintal – 11th Chief Justice of the Supreme Court of the Philippines; 14th Speaker of the House of Representatives; member, Upsilon Sigma Phi
 Enrique Fernando – 13th Chief Justice of the Supreme Court of the Philippines; member, Upsilon Sigma Phi
 Estanislao Fernandez – Associate Justice, Supreme Court of the Philippines; member, Upsilon Sigma Phi
 Carmelino Alvendia Sr. – Associate Justice, Court of Appeals; Founder, Quezon City Academy; member, Upsilon Sigma Phi
 Gregorio Pio Catapang – Chief of Staff, Armed Forces of the Philippines (AFP); member, Upsilon Sigma Phi
 Jolly R. Bugarin – Director, National Bureau of Investigation (NBI); President, International Criminal Police Organization (INTERPOL); member, Upsilon Sigma Phi
 Alfonso Calalang – Governor, Central Bank of the Philippines; member, Upsilon Sigma Phi
 Christian Monsod – COMELEC Chairman; Commissioner, 1987 Constitutional Commission; member, Upsilon Sigma Phi
 Delia Albert – Secretary of Foreign Affairs (2003–2004)
 Leandro Alejandro – student council leader, 
 Edgardo J. Angara – Senator, Senate president (1993–1995); University of the Philippines president (1981–1987)
 Juan Edgardo Angara – House of Representatives member
 Bellaflor Angara-Castillo – Governor of Aurora; House of Representatives member (1995–2004); Majority Floor Leader of the House of Representatives (2000–2001)
 Ma. Alicia Austria-Martinez – Supreme Court associate justice (2002–2009)
 Lauro Baja – Ambassador to the United Nations (2003–2007); member, Alpha Phi Beta Fraternity
 Robert Barbers – Senator (1998–2004); member, Alpha Phi Beta Fraternity
 Herbert Bautista – Mayor of Quezon City; movie and TV actor 
 Jejomar Binay Jr. – Mayor of Makati
 Antonio Carpio – Supreme Court associate justice
 Alan Peter Cayetano – Senator and House of Representatives member (1998–2007)
 Pia Cayetano – Senator
 Rene Cayetano – Senator (1998–2003)
 Edgardo Chatto – Governor of Bohol; House of Representatives member (2001–2010); lawyer
 Minita Chico-Nazario – Supreme Court associate justice (2004–2009)
 Nikki Coseteng – Senator (1992–2001) and House of Representatives member (1987–1992)
 Simeon Datumanong – House of Representatives member and Cabinet secretary
 Hilario Davide Jr. – Supreme Court chief justice (1998–2005)
 Teresita de Castro – Supreme Court associate justice
 Arthur Defensor Sr. – Governor of Iloilo; House of Representatives member (2001–2010)
 Michael Defensor – Secretary of Environment and Natural Resources (2004–2006); House of Representatives member (1995–2001); Presidential Chief of Staff (2006–2007)
 Franklin Drilon – Senator
 Emilio Ramon Ejercito – actor; Mayor of Pagsanjan, Laguna (2001–2010); Governor of Laguna
 Juan Ponce Enrile – Senator and Senate president, former Defense Minister
 Francis Escudero – Senator and House of Representatives member (1998–2007); member, Alpha Phi Beta Fraternity
 Erlinda Fadera-Basilio – Ambassador and Permanent Representative of the Philippines to the United Nations and Other International Organizations in Geneva ; Undersecretary for Policy,  Department of Foreign Affairs; Ambassador to China
 Marcelo Fernan – Supreme Court chief justice (1988–1991); Philippine senator (1995–1999); Senate president (1998–1999)
 Cancio Garcia – Supreme Court associate justice (2004–2007)
 Gwendolyn Garcia – Governor of Cebu
 Pablo John Garcia – House of Representatives member;  member, Alpha Phi Beta Fraternity
 Carolina Griño-Aquino – Supreme Court associate justice (1988–1993)
 Roseller Guiao – Vice Governor of Pampanga;head coach of the Red Bull Barako team in the PBA
 Magtanggol Gunigundo – House of Representatives member
 Constantino Jaraula – House of Representatives member (1998–2007)
 Francis Jardeleza – Solicitor General
 Edcel C. Lagman – House of Representatives member;  member, Alpha Phi Beta Fraternity
 Salvador H. Laurel – Vice President of the Philippines (1986–1992)
 Katrina Legarda – lawyer
 Loren Legarda – Senator and broadcast journalist
 Marvic Leonen – Supreme Court associate justice 
 Cardozo Luna – Undersecretary of Department of National Defense (2016–Present); former Philippine Ambassador to the Netherlands (2009–2010); former Vice Chief of Staff and Lieutenant General of the Armed Forces of the Philippines (2008–2009)
 Gloria Macapagal Arroyo – President of the Philippines (2001–2010); House of Representatives member
 Catalino Macaraig Jr. – Executive Secretary (1987–1990)
 Liza Maza – House of Representatives member (2001–2010)
 Heidi Mendoza – Undersecretary General for the United Nations Office of Internal Oversight and former commissioner and officer-in-charge of the Commission on Audit
 Nur Misuari – former leader of the Moro National Liberation Front (MNLF)
 Conchita Morales – Ombudsman; Supreme Court associate justice (2002–2011)
 Oscar Orbos – lawyer, Executive Secretary (1990–1991); Governor of Pangasinan (1995–1998), and TV host;  member, Alpha Phi Beta Fraternity
 Rey Pagtakhan – Canadian cabinet minister and Parliament of Canada member (1988–2004)
 Aquilino Pimentel III – Senator
 Reynato Puno –  Supreme Court chief justice (2006–2010);  member, Alpha Phi Beta Fraternity
 Romero Quimbo – House of Representatives member
 Leonardo Quisumbing – Supreme Court associate justice (1998–2009); member, Alpha Phi Beta Fraternity
 Gilbert Remulla – House of Representatives member (2001–2007); broadcast journalist
 Juanito Victor Remulla – Governor of Cavite
 Jesse Robredo – Secretary of the Interior and Local Government (2010–2012); Mayor of Naga City (2001–2010)
 Leni Robredo – Vice President of the Philippines (2016–2022)
 Rufus Rodriguez – House of Representatives member; lawyer
 Flerida Ruth Romero – Supreme Court associate justice (1991–1999)
 Rafael Salas – first head of the United Nations Population Fund
 Miriam Defensor Santiago – Senator, Cum Laude
 Abraham Sarmiento – Supreme Court associate justice (1987–1991)
 Abraham Sarmiento Jr. – martial law activist; editor-in-chief of the Philippine Collegian; member, Alpha Phi Beta Fraternity
 Ma. Lourdes Sereno – Supreme Court chief justice
 Jose Maria Sison – Communist Party of the Philippines founder
 Victor Sumulong – House of Representatives member (1998–2007)
 Ruben D. Torres – Secretary of Labor and Employment (1990–1992); Executive Secretary (1995–1998)
 Antonio Trillanes IV – Senator; Oakwood mutiny and Manila Peninsula mutiny leader
 Niel Tupas Jr. – House of Representatives member
 Niel Tupas Sr. – Governor of Iloilo (2001–2010); House of Representatives member (1978–1984; 1987–1998) 
 Presbitero Velasco Jr. – Supreme Court associate justice
 Luis Villafuerte – House of Representatives member
 Manuel Villar – Senator, Senate president (2006–2008); Speaker of the House of Representatives (1998–2000)
 Liwayway Vinzons-Chato – House of Representatives member (2007–2010)
 Perfecto Yasay – Chairperson of the Securities and Exchange Commission (1995–2000)
 Consuelo Ynares-Santiago – Supreme Court associate justice (1999–2009)
 Haydee Yorac – Chairwoman of the Commission on Elections (1989–1991) and the Presidential Commission on Good Government (2001–2005)
 Nancy Binay- Senator of the Philippines (2013-present)

Social sciences

Sports
 Chito Salud – President/CEO/Commissioner, Philippine Basketball Association; member, Upsilon Sigma Phi
 Eric Altamirano – basketball coach, former member of the UP Fighting Maroons basketball team
 Jun Bernardino – former member of the UP Fighting Maroons basketball team, and former commissioner of the NCAA and PBA
 Marvin Cruz – former UP Fighting Maroons basketball player; former player of the Burger King Whoppers in the PBA
 Ryan Gregorio – former UP Fighting Maroons player; former head coach of the Meralco Bolts basketball team in the PBA
 Yeng Guiao – current head coach of the Rain or Shine Elasto Painters team in the PBA; Pampanga vice governor
 Jireh Ibañes – former UP Fighting Maroons basketball player; former player of Rain or Shine Elasto Painters in the PBA
 Joe Lipa – former UP Fighting Maroons basketball player; commissioner of the UAAP; former UP Fighting Maroons basketball team coach; commissioner of the NCAA
 Ronnie Magsanoc – former UP Fighting Maroons basketball player; current assistant coach of the Purefoods Tender Juicy Giants team in the PBA
 Paolo Mendoza – former UP Fighting Maroons player; current player of the Sta. Lucia Realtors in the PBA
 Benjie Paras – TV actor, comedian and host; former member of the UP Fighting Maroons basketball team and the PBA
 Bo Perasol – former UP Fighting Maroons basketball player; former head coach of the Air21 Express basketball team; current UP Fighting Maroons basketball program director; member, Alpha Phi Beta Fraternity

University and college student council leaders

UP Diliman
 Lean Alejandro - USC Chairperson
 Atom Araullo - USC Councilor, ABS CBN Reporter
 Jejomar Binay - USC Councilor
 Alan Peter Cayetano - USC Councilor
 Randy David - USC Vice Chairperson
 Michael Defensor - USC Vice Chairperson
 Franklin Drilon - USC Councilor
 Marcelo Fernan - USC Chairperson
 Richard Gordon - USC Councilor; member, Upsilon Sigma Phi
 Raymond Palatino - USC Chairperson; National Union of Students of the Philippines National President; former Representative of Kabataan Partylist in the Congress
 Francis Pangilinan - USC Chairperson; member, Upsilon Sigma Phi
 Alfredo Pascual - USC Councilor; member, Upsilon Sigma Phi
 Leonardo Quisumbing - USC Chairperson
 Rafael Salas - USC Chairperson
 Miriam Defensor Santiago - USC Vice Chairperson, Philippine Collegian Editor-in Chief
 Eric de Guia (aka Kidlat Tahimik ) - Student Union Chairperson; member, Upsilon Sigma Phi
 Wenceslao Vinzons - USC Chairperson; member, Upsilon Sigma Phi

Notable past and present faculty
Maria Ressa - journalist and Rappler CEO; included in the Times Person of the Year 2018 and first Filipina Nobel Peace Prize laureate
Romulo Davide - National Academy of Science and Technology, Nematology/Plant Pathology; Upsilon Sigma Phi
Jose Juliano - National Academy of Science and Technology, Nuclear Chemistry and Physics; Upsilon Sigma Phi
 Vicente Abad Santos - former Supreme Court justice
 Nicanor Abelardo - Filipino musician, composer of "U.P. Naming Mahal" ("U.P. Beloved"), the University of the Philippines hymn
 José Abueva - former University of the Philippines president
 Napoleon Abueva - sculptor and National Artist
 Virgilio S. Almario - National Artist; former director of the U.P. Institute of Creative Writing; current UP College of Arts and Letters dean
 Walden Bello - sociologist
 Henry Otley Beyer - co-founder, UP Department of Anthropology
 Emilia Boncodin - former Budget and Management secretary; Hyatt 10 member
 Clarita Carlos - political analyst; president of Center for Asia Pacific Studies, Inc.; pioneer of political psychology in the country
 Ryan Cayabyab - musician, artistic director of the San Miguel Foundation for the Performing Arts
 Irene Cortes - lawyer and former Supreme Court of the Philippines justice
 Adrian Cristobal - writer, columnist
 Isagani R. Cruz - literary critic and playwright
 Randy David - professor of sociology; newspaper columnist; former TV public affairs host
 Malou de Guzman - film and TV actress, former senior lecturer at the UP Film Institute
 Juan R. Francisco - indologist and professor
 N. V. M. Gonzalez - fictionist and National Artist
 Margarita Holmes - renowned psychologist and sex expert, TV personality
 Jun Lana - playwright, screenwriter and director
 Cheche Lazaro - broadcast journalist; founding president of Probe Productions, Inc.
 Salvador P. Lopez - writer, journalist, diplomat, former University of the Philippines president
 Alexander Magno - political scientist, TV host, newspaper columnist
 Rogemar Mamon - mathematician, quantitative analyst, British and Canadian academic
 Paz Márquez-Benítez - fictionist
 Felipe B. Miranda - founder of Pulse Asia; Professor Emeritus at University of the Philippines Diliman Department of Political Science
 Solita Monsod - professor of economics, former Economic Planning secretary, newspaper columnist, broadcast journalist
Ambeth R. Ocampo - historian, writer, Chairman National Historical Institute, TOYM History, decorated by Spain and France
 Cristina Padolina - professor of chemistry; current President of Centro Escolar University
 Raymundo Punongbayan - geologist, former Philippine Institute of Volcanology and Seismology (PHIVOLCS) director
 Henry J. Ramos - first Filipino plasma physicist, inventor
 Nicanor Reyes Sr. - economist, one of the founders of Far Eastern University
 Temario Rivera - political scientist
 Carlos P. Romulo - Pulitzer Prize winner, president of the United Nations General Assembly 1949–1950, former chairman of the United Nations Security Council and University of the Philippines president
 Caesar Saloma - applied physicist, Dean of College of Science, recipient of 2004 International Commission for Optics' Galileo Award, 2008 ASEAN Outstanding Scientist and Technologist Award
 E. San Juan Jr. - poet and cultural critic
 Bienvenido Santos - poet and fictionist
 Rogelio R. Sikat - writer
 Cesar Virata - former Philippines prime minister and Finance secretary; former dean and professor at the UP College of Business Administration
 Haydee Yorac - professor of law; former Philippine Commission of Elections; chairperson of the Presidential Commission on Good Government (PCGG) commissioner
 Prescillano Zamora - professor of biology

Faculty members who are writers
 Gémino Abad
 Mila Aguilar
 Virgilio Almario
 José Wendell Capili
 Lourdes Castrillo Brillantes
 Conchitina Cruz
 Jose Dalisay Jr.
 J. Neil Garcia
 Luis Katigbak
 Domingo Landicho
 Bienvenido Lumbera
 Paolo Manalo
 Ambeth R. Ocampo
 Cristina Pantoja-Hidalgo
 Ligaya Tiamson-Rubin
 Nicanor Tiongson
 Ricardo de Ungria
 Rene Villanueva

National Artists
Of the 66 National Artists of the Philippines thus far honored, the majority are UP alumni, including three former students who did not earn their degree at the university. The honored league of National Artists from UP are:

 Architecture
 Juan Nakpil
 Ildefonso Santos
 Dance
 Ramon Obusan
 Francisca Reyes-Aquino
 Film
 Ishmael Bernal
 Lino Brocka
 Eddie Romero
 Literature
 Francisco Arcellana
 Virgilio S. Almario
 N.V.M. Gonzalez
 Amado V. Hernandez
 F. Sionil José
 Bienvenido Lumbera
 Carlos P. Romulo
 Edith Tiempo
 José García Villa
 Music
 Ryan Cayabyab
 Levi Celerio
 Jose Maceda
 Antonio Molina
 Ramon Santos
 Lucio San Pedro
 Andrea Veneración
Felipe Padilla de Leon
 Theater
 Daisy Avellana
 Wilfrido Ma. Guerrero
 Severino Montano
 Rolando S. Tinio
 Visual Arts
 Napoleon Abueva
 Fernando Amorsolo
 Benedicto Cabrera
 Botong Francisco
 Abdulmari Asia Imao
 José Joya
 Cesar Legaspi
 Vicente Manansala
 Guillermo Tolentino

National Scientists
Several UP alumni and faculty members have been named as National Scientists of the Philippines. This is the highest award accorded to Filipino scientists by the Philippine government.
 Juan Salcedo Jr. (1978)
 Fe del Mundo (1980)
 Eduardo Quisumbing (1980)
 Carmen Velasquez (1983)
 Teodoro Agoncillo (1985)
 Encarnacion Alzona (1985)
 Julian Banzon (1986)
 Dioscoro Umali (1986)
 Luz Oliveros-Belardo (1987)
 Jose Encarnacion Jr. (1987) – National Scientist, Economics; Dean, UP School of Economics; Upsilon Sigma Phi
 Alfredo Lagmay (1988)
 Paulo Campos (1989)
 Jose Velasco (1998)
 Benito Vergara (2001)
 Onofre Corpuz (2004) – National Scientist, Political Economy and Government; 13th President, University of the Philippines; Upsilon Sigma Phi

References

External links
 U.P. System

University of the Philippines Diliman

University Of The Philippines
Lists of alumni by university or college in the Philippines
Lists of Filipino people by school affiliation